Jack Christopher Senior (born 13 January 1997) is an English professional footballer who plays as a left-back for  club FC Halifax Town.

Career

Huddersfield Town
Born in Halifax, West Yorkshire, Senior started out at Elland Juniors before joining the youth system at Huddersfield Town aged 10. He began a two-year scholarship at the start of 2013–14, before signing his first professional contract with the club for 2015–16. Senior was involved in the first-team pre-season programme, but predominantly played for the Development Squad that won the Northern Division by eight points, for whom he scored two goals from 36 appearances. At the end of the season, Huddersfield took up the option to extend Senior's contract by a further year.

Luton Town
Senior signed for League Two club Luton Town on a two-year contract on 31 August 2016. After signing for Luton, manager Nathan Jones said "He ticks all the boxes for us. He's a young, hungry and athletic player who wants to learn." He suffered an injury setback in training, though he made his Luton debut on 4 October, starting in their 2–0 victory at home to West Bromwich Albion U21 in the EFL Trophy. Senior made his English Football League debut as a 56th-minute substitute for Jordan Cook in a 2–1 win away to Crewe Alexandra on 14 January 2017. Thereafter, he made 10 consecutive starts, which ended when he was rested for Luton's league match against Yeovil Town on 4 March. Senior started in Luton's 1–1 draw at home to Exeter City two weeks later, but missed their subsequent four matches after he was sidelined with a foot injury. In April 2017, he was named in the EFL Trophy Team of the Tournament. Despite being available for selection, Senior made no further appearances and finished 2016–17 with 16 appearances.

On 14 November 2017, Senior signed a one-year contract extension with Luton, with the option of a further year. He joined National League club Harrogate Town on 31 January 2019 on loan until the end of 2018–19. Senior was released by Luton when his contract expired at the end of the 2018–19 season.

Gloucester City
After leaving Luton, Senior went on trial with Grimsby Town in July 2019, but was not offered a contract. He signed for National League North club Gloucester City on 26 November 2019 and scored on his debut four days later in a 2–2 home draw with Kettering Town.

FC Halifax Town
Senior signed for National League club FC Halifax Town on 21 August 2020.

Career statistics

Honours
Individual
EFL Trophy Team of the Tournament: 2016–17

References

1997 births
Living people
Footballers from Halifax, West Yorkshire
English footballers
Association football defenders
Huddersfield Town A.F.C. players
Luton Town F.C. players
Harrogate Town A.F.C. players
Gloucester City A.F.C. players
FC Halifax Town players
English Football League players
National League (English football) players